The Abrahamite monks were an order of monks in a monastery at Constantinople, founded by Abraham of Ephesus, who were martyred around 835  during the iconoclast persecutions of Emperor Theophilus. They are regarded as saints by the Roman Catholic Church, with a feast day of July 8.

References

Sources
Holweck, F. G. A Biographical Dictionary of the Saints. St. Louis, MO: B. Herder Book Co. 1924.

9th-century deaths
Abrahamite monks
9th-century Christian martyrs
9th-century Christian saints
Year of birth unknown